Sydney Boisselle (born 19 May 2000) is a Canadian-raised Trinidad and Tobago footballer who plays as a midfielder for the York Lions and as a right back for the Trinidad and Tobago women's national team.

Club career
Boisselle played for Trinidadian club St. Augustine FC.

International career
Boisselle played for Trinidad and Tobago at senior level in the 2020 CONCACAF Women's Olympic Qualifying Championship qualification.

References

External links

2000 births
Living people
Women's association football midfielders
Women's association football fullbacks
Trinidad and Tobago women's footballers
Trinidad and Tobago women's international footballers
Black Canadian women's soccer players
Canadian sportspeople of Trinidad and Tobago descent
York Lions soccer players